Shiva Feshareki is a British-Iranian experimental composer, turntable artist and radio presenter. As a turntablist, she plays her compositions solo or alongside classical orchestras. She was born in London in 1987. She obtained a Doctorate of Music from the Royal College of Music. In 2017 she was honoured with the Ivor Novello Award for Innovation (formerly British Composer Award).

Compositions
Through her research and compositional work she contributed to a rediscovery of some early pioneers of electronic music, such as Pauline Oliveros, Daphne Oram and Éliane Radigue. This includes her work on the completion and realisation of Daphne Oram's 'Still Point' at the BBC Proms alongside James Bulley.

2019

'Opus Infinity' - A Spatial Composition for Turntables, Ensemble and Bespoke Soundsystem. Premiere by Shiva Feshareki and Ensemble Modern at Frankfurt LAB (2020).

‘Meditation on a Spiral Staircase’ - for Turntables and Spatialised Brass Ensemble, premiered at SOUNDLab by Shiva Feshareki and the Brass players of Szczecin Philharmonic.
'Vapour' - Electronic Track (single) 

‘Liquid Pyramid’ - Audio-Visual Collaboration with alx.000000 

‘Perpetual Motion (in two contrasting movements)’ - for Violin, Cello and Electronics, premiered by Britten Sinfonia at Milton Court, Barbican Centre.

NEW FORMS LP

Awards
 BASCA British Composer Award for Innovation in 2017
 London Music Masters Composer Award in 2016
 Royal Philharmonic Society Composition Prize 2009
 Women Make Music PRS award
 BBC/Guardian Young Composer of the Year in 2004

UK and international festivals
 The BBC Proms
 MUTEK, Montreal
 MaerzMusik (The Long Now) - Kraftwerk, Berlin.

References

External links
 

British women composers
English composers
English electronic musicians
English people of Iranian descent
1987 births
Living people
English women in electronic music
21st-century English women musicians
21st-century British composers
21st-century women composers